2016 Mogadishu attack may refer to:

January 2016 Mogadishu attack
February 2016 Mogadishu attack
June 2016 Mogadishu attacks
November 2016 Mogadishu car bombing
December 2016 Mogadishu suicide bombing